Epic Games is an American video game and software developer based in Cary, North Carolina. It was founded by Tim Sweeney as Potomac Computer Systems in 1991, originally located in his parents' house in Potomac, Maryland. After releasing one game under that name, ZZT (1991), Sweeney renamed the company to Epic MegaGames in early 1992 "to make it look like we were a big company" even though it had no other employees or offices. Over the next few years, the company continued to make PC games, largely self-published, including the side-scrollers Jill of the Jungle (1992) and Jazz Jackrabbit (1994). They additionally published titles by other developers such as Epic Pinball (1993) by Digital Extremes and Tyrian (1995) by Eclipse Software. Epic also slowly expanded in size, reaching 8 employees by 1994.

Beginning with the 1996 game Fire Fight, Epic ceased its publishing and self-publishing operations, and after the release and success of Unreal (1998) renamed itself in 1999 to Epic Games and moved to Raleigh, North Carolina; it and a temporary office in Canada during Unreals development were the first time the company had a central office for their employees. After the name change, the company focused almost solely on the Unreal series of shooters for the next few years, and expanded from PC games to console games. In 2006 the company launched its Gears of War series of games, and in 2010 the company moved into mobile games with the Infinity Blade series after purchasing Chair Entertainment. Epic returned to retail publishing in 2015 for its own titles, and has solely self-published since. In addition to games, Epic develops and licenses the Unreal Engine, which is also used as the game engine for many of its own games, and runs the Epic Games Store, a digital video game storefront for Microsoft Windows and macOS.

Sweeney described the history of the company in 2016 as four eras: the shareware era from founding through 1997 as the company grew to 15 employees; the Unreal era from 1998 to 2005 as the company focused on developing that franchise through external publishers and grew to 25 employees; the Gears of War era from 2006 to 2011 as the company shifted focus to console games and grew to around 200 employees; and the current era where the company moved back to PC games and self-publishing, spinning off or closing some of its subsidiary developers such as People Can Fly and Big Huge Games. This latter era has instead become dominated by the multi-platform Fortnite Battle Royale and related games, which is one of the most-played video games of all time with over 350 million registered players. Epic Games has developed around 40 games since 1991 and published over 20 more, and has multiple games under development.

Video games
Epic Games has used the names Potomac Computer Systems, Epic MegaGames, and Epic Games; the name given for the company is the one used at the time of a game's release. Many of the games under the Epic MegaGames brand were released as a set of separate episodes, which were purchasable and playable separately or as a group. In many cases the initial episode of a game was freely distributed as shareware to drive interest in the other purchasable episodes. Titles are listed for games that gave individual names to their episodes instead of episode numbers.

Developed games

Published games
In addition to publishing many of its own games, Epic published several titles by other developers in the early 1990s as Epic MegaGames before ceasing publishing operations. In 2020, it launched Epic Games Publishing as a new publishing wing.

Cancelled games

Notes

References

External links
 

Epic Games